In mathematical physics, the classical Gaudin model is a classical mechanical system which is a classical analogue to the quantum Gaudin model. The historical development differs from the usual development for physical systems in that the quantum system was defined and studied, by Michel Gaudin, earlier than the classical system. The classical Gaudin models are integrable.

Mathematical formulation 
As for any classical system, the Gaudin model is specified by a Poisson manifold  referred to as the phase space , and a smooth function on the manifold called the Hamiltonian.

Phase space 
Let  be a quadratic Lie algebra, that is, a Lie algebra with a non-degenerate invariant bilinear form . If  is complex and simple, this can be taken to be the Killing form.

The dual, denoted , can be made into a linear Poisson structure by the Kirillov–Kostant bracket.

Sites 

Hamiltonian 
The definition of the Hamiltonian takes considerable set-up.

These in turn are used to define -valued functions

with implicit summation.

Next, these are used to define the Lax matrix which is also a  valued function on the phase space which in addition depends meromorphically on a spectral parameter ,

The Hamiltonian is then

which is indeed a function on the phase space, which is additionally dependent on a spectral parameter.

Integrable field theories as classical Gaudin models 
Certain integrable classical field theories can be formulated as classical affine Gaudin models. Such classical field theories include the principal chiral model, coset sigma models and affine Toda field theory.

Quantum Gaudin models 
A great deal is known about the integrable structure of quantum Gaudin models. In particular, Feigin, Frenkel and Reshetikhin studied them using the theory of vertex operator algebras, showing the relation of Gaudin models to topics in mathematics including the Knizhnik–Zamolodchikov equations and the geometric Langlands correspondence.

References 

Classical mechanics